Babsk  is a village in the administrative district of Gmina Biała Rawska, within Rawa County, Łódź Voivodeship, in central Poland.

The village has a population of 690. It was probably founded in the 14th century.

In 1989, the legendary Juventus footballer Gaetano Scirea died in a car accident in this village.

References

External links
 Babsk (in Polish)
 Map

Babsk